The Federal Judicial Center is the education and research agency of the United States federal courts.

conducting and promoting "research and study of the operation of the courts of the United States," and to act to encourage and coordinate the same by others;
developing "recommendations for improvement of the administration and management of [U.S.] courts," and presenting these to the Judicial Conference of the U.S.; and
 through all means available, see to conducting programs for the "continuing education and training for personnel" of the U.S. judiciary, for all employees in the justice system, from judges through probation officers and mediators.

In addition to these major provisions, §620 (b)(4)(5)(6) sets forth the additional provisions that the FJC will (i) provide staff and assistance to the Judicial Conference and component bodies, (ii) coordinate programs and research on the administration of justice with the State Justice Institute, and (iii) cooperatively assist other government agencies in providing advice, and receiving advice, regarding judicial administration in foreign countries, in each of these cases, to the extent it is "consistent with the performance of the other functions set forth" earlier.

The Code also states (§621) that the Chief Justice of the United States is the permanent Chair of the Center's board, and that it includes the director of the Administrative Office of the United States Courts and seven federal judges elected by the Judicial Conference. The Board appoints the Center's director and deputy director; the director appoints the Center's staff. Since its founding in 1967, the Center has had eleven directors. The current director is John S. Cooke. The deputy director is Clara Altman.

History 
The Federal Judicial Center was established by Congress on the recommendation of Chief Justice Earl Warren and other members of the judiciary who hoped that regular programs of research and education would improve the efficiency of the federal courts and help to relieve the backlog of cases in the lower courts. Governed by its own board, the Federal Judicial Center offered the courts the benefits of independent social science research and educational programs designed to improve judicial administration.

In the 1950s and early 1960s, the Judicial Conference and the Administrative Office increasingly commissioned research projects to examine problems of judicial administration and organized educational programs to help judges manage growing and complicated caseloads. These research and educational programs had no permanent staff or funding. Support for an institutionalized program of judicial research and education increased after the establishment of 60 new district judgeships in 1961 demonstrated that the number of judges alone would not solve all of the problems of overworked courts. A growing number of judges and members of the bar urged the judiciary to establish a formal means to bring improved research and education to the courts.

At the suggestion of Chief Justice Warren, the Judicial Conference in 1966 authorized a committee to examine the research and education requirements of the judiciary. Former Justice Stanley Reed agreed to Warren’s request to chair the committee. As the Reed committee formulated its recommendation for establishment of a Federal Judicial Center, President Johnson, at Warren’s request, included the proposal in his highly publicized message on crime in February 1967. The Judicial Committee adopted the recommendation. Bills to create the Center were soon submitted in both houses of Congress. With broad support for the concept of a research and education center for the judiciary, discussion in the House and Senate hearings centered on questions about the proper institutional form and leadership for the Center.

The Reed Committee and the director of the Administrative Office, among others, advocated an independent agency with its own governing board to which the Center director would report. The goal was to protect the research and education resources from being absorbed into strictly administrative duties and to insure the objectivity of research. The Federal Judicial Center’s board consists of the Chief Justice, a rotating group of judges selected by the Judicial Conference, and the director of the Administrative Office; no member of the Judicial Conference was to serve on the Center’s board. The statute authorizes the Center to conduct and support research on the operation of the courts, to offer education and training for judges and court personnel, and to assist and advise the Judicial Conference on matters related to the administration and management of the courts. Later legislation expanded the Center’s mandate to include  programs related to the history of the federal judiciary.

A. Leo Levin was the Director of the Federal Judicial Center from 1977 to 1987.

Organization 

The Center includes several offices and divisions.

The Director's Office is responsible for the Center's overall management and its relations with other organizations. Its Office of Systems Innovation and Development (OSID) provides technical support for Center education and research. Communications Policy and Design (CPD) edits, produces, and distributes all Center print and electronic publications, operates the Federal Judicial Television Network, and through the Information Services Office maintains a specialized library collection of materials on judicial administration.

The Research Division undertakes empirical and exploratory research on federal judicial processes, judicial resources, court administration and case management, federal-state jurisdiction and cooperation, and sentencing and its consequences, often at the request of the Judicial Conference and its committees, the courts themselves, or other groups in the federal system. Elizabeth Wiggins is the current director of the research division. She is the third research division director in the history of the Federal Judicial Center. 

The Federal Judicial History Office develops programs relating to the history of the judicial branch and assists courts with their own judicial history program.

The Education Division plans and organizes educational sessions for federal judges and court staff.

The International Judicial Relations Office carries out the Center's statutory mission to provide information about federal courts to officials of foreign judicial systems and to acquire information about foreign judicial systems that will help the Center perform its other missions.  The office administers the Center's International Visitor briefing program and the Visiting Foreign Judicial Fellows Program.

Board and funding
As of February 2021 the Center's board consists of:

John G. Roberts Jr., Chief Justice of the United States, chair (Sept. 2005–present)
Judge Duane Benton, U.S. Court of Appeals for the Eighth Circuit (Mar. 2018–present)
Judge Thomas Hardiman, U.S. Court of Appeals for the Third Circuit (Mar. 2020–present)
Judge Raymond Alvin Jackson, U.S. District Court for the Eastern District of Virginia (Mar. 2019–present)
Judge Nancy D. Freudenthal, U.S. District Court for the District of Wyoming (Mar. 2019–present)
Senior Judge Carol Amon, U.S. District Court for the Eastern District of New York (Mar. 2020–present)
Chief Bankruptcy Judge Mildred Cabán, U.S. Bankruptcy Court for the District of Puerto Rico
Magistrate Judge Tim Baker, U.S. District Court for the Southern District of Indiana (Mar. 2017–present)
Judge Roslynn R. Mauskopf, Director of the Administrative Office of the U.S. Courts (Feb. 2021–present)

A nonprofit organization, the Federal Judicial Center Foundation, solicits support for the Center.

References

External links
 
Federal Judicial Center Foundation

Center
Legal education in the United States
Government agencies established in 1967
1967 establishments in Washington, D.C.